is an illustrator and manga artist who was born in Toyama Prefecture, Japan. After graduating from high school in 1973, he moved to Tokyo and began attending classes at Chiyoda Designer Academy, though he left before completing his degree. During the mid-1970s, he worked as a background artist for Shinji Wada, helping with works such as Sukeban Deka. He joined the dōjinshi circle  in 1975, and worked as an assistant to Motoka Murakami during the mid- to late 1970s.

In August 1980, Hayasaka released his dōjinshi Fritha. In April of the following year, he was put in charge of the "My Anime Jockey" section of the first issue of My Anime, and in January 1982, he made his professional manga debut with Hara Hara Fairy in the magazine . Hayasaka is most well known for being a major artist in the lolicon manga boom in the late 1970s and 1980s. He has had stories published in lolicon magazines such as Manga Burikko, Alice Club, and Fusion Product, as well as the long-running Petit Apple Pie manga anthology.

His Maiko! series has been called a "hard bishōjo Sazae-san". His last work,  Maiko! Final Run, was published in November 1989. He has since become a salaryman, and no longer publishes in the manga industry.

Works

 (November 1983, Tokuma Shoten)
 (1984, Tokyo Sanseisha)
 (October 1985, Tokyo Sanseisha)
 (June 1986, Tokyo Sanseisha)
 (November 1989, Tokyo Sanseisha)
 (Tokyo Sanseisha)
 (1987-01-10, Tokyo Sanseisha)

Anthologies
Hayasaka's work has appeared in the following anthologies.
 (1982-11-10, ISBN)
 (multiple issues, Tokyo Sanseisha)

Sources:

References

External links
 早坂未紀の世界

1955 births
Japanese illustrators
Living people
Manga artists from Toyama Prefecture